İshaklar is a village in Gülnar district of  Mersin Province, Turkey. At  it is situated in Toros Mountains. The population of the village was 651  as of 2012. (According to a personal page the original name of the village was İyisaklar ("good keeper") referring to an old event in which lost sheep of the village were found and kept by a shepherd.)

References

Villages in Gülnar District